John H. Richmond (March 5, 1855 – October 5, 1898) was an American Major League Baseball player for eight seasons.  He played mainly as a shortstop and center fielder for seven different teams from 1875 to 1885.

Richmond died in his hometown of Philadelphia, Pennsylvania at the age of 43, and is interred at Northwood Cemetery in Philadelphia.

References

External links

Major League Baseball center fielders
Major League Baseball shortstops
Baseball players from Pennsylvania
19th-century baseball players
Philadelphia Athletics (NA) players
Syracuse Stars (NL) players
Boston Red Caps players
Cleveland Blues (NL) players
Philadelphia Athletics (AA) players
Columbus Buckeyes players
Pittsburgh Alleghenys players
1855 births
1898 deaths
Binghamton Crickets (1870s) players
Utica (minor league baseball) players
Baltimore (minor league baseball) players
Rochester (minor league baseball) players
Philadelphia Athletics (minor league) players
Memphis Reds players
Oswego Starchboxes players
Charleston Seagulls players
Waterbury Brass Citys players
Burials at Northwood Cemetery, Philadelphia